Prezza is a town and comune in the province of L'Aquila, in central Italy.

References

External links
 https://web.archive.org/web/20100514093712/http://www.prolocoprezza.it/
 http://www.holidayhomesprezza.com

Cities and towns in Abruzzo